Handball at the 1980 Summer Olympics was represented by 2 events - a men's and a women's team competitions. They were held in two venues: in the Sokolniki Sports Palace (central part of Moscow) and in the Dynamo Sports Palace at Khimki-Khovrino (north-eastern part of Moscow). The schedule began on July 20 and ended on July 30.
100,493 spectators watched 51 matches of handball events at venues, mentioned above.

Medal summary

Participating nations

Each qualified country was allowed to enter one team of 14 players and they all were eligible for participation. Four nations competed in both tournaments.

A total of 248(*) handball players (166 men and 82 women) from 14 nations (men from 12 nations - women from 6 nations) competed at the Moscow Games:

  (men:14 women:0)
  (men:0 women:14)
  (men:13 women:0)
  (men:0 women:13)
  (men:14 women:0)
  (men:14 women:14)
  (men:14 women:14)
  (men:14 women:0)
  (men:14 women:0)
  (men:14 women:0)
  (men:14 women:14)
  (men:13 women:0)
  (men:14 women:0)
  (men:14 women:14)
(*) NOTE: There are only players counted, which participated in one game at least.

Medal table

Remark:country names are not given in the form they were used in the official documents of the IOC in 1980.

Literature 
 (Program magazine)

References

External links
 Official Olympic Report

 
1980 Summer Olympics events
Olym
International handball competitions hosted by the Soviet Union
Olymp
Women's events at the 1980 Summer Olympics